Marceli Bogusławski (born 7 September 1997) is a Polish cyclist, who currently rides for UCI Continental team  and as a stagiaire for UCI WorldTeam .

Major results

Road

2018
 7th Overall Dookoła Mazowsza
2019
 1st Prologue Carpathian Couriers Race
 7th GP Slovakia, Visegrad 4 Bicycle Race
2020
 1st Prologue Tour Bitwa Warszawska 1920
2021
 1st Prologue Tour of Bulgaria
 1st Prologue International Tour of Rhodes
 4th Overall Tour of Estonia
1st  Mountains classification
2022
 1st  Overall Dookoła Mazowsza
1st  Points classification
1st Stage 1
 1st Grand Prix Nasielsk-Serock
 1st Grand Prix Poland
 1st Stage 1 Tour of Thailand
 1st Stage 1 Dookoła Mazowsza
 2nd Grand Prix Wyszków
 4th Puchar MON
 10th Overall Belgrade Banjaluka
1st Stage 1 (TTT)

Cyclo-cross
2013–2014
 1st  National Junior Championships
2014–2015
 2nd National Junior Championships
2015–2016
 2nd National Championships
2016–2017
 3rd National Championships

MTB
2014
 1st  National Junior XCO Championships
2016
 1st  National Under-23 XCO Championships

References

External links

1997 births
Living people
Polish male cyclists
People from Opoczno
Sportspeople from Łódź Voivodeship